The following television stations broadcast on digital channel 11 in the United States:

 K10OA-D in Terrace Lakes, Idaho
 K11AT-D in Gunnison, Colorado, on virtual channel 7
 K11BD-D in Leadore, Idaho
 K11BM-D in Methow, Washington
 K11BX-D in Sutherlin, Oregon
 K11CN-D in Caliente, Nevada
 K11CP-D in Fish Creek, Idaho
 K11CQ-D in Cedar City, Utah, on virtual channel 4, which rebroadcasts KTVX
 K11CS-D in Rock Island, Washington
 K11DL-D in Juliaetta, Idaho
 K11ED-D in Ruth, Nevada
 K11EE-D in Ely & McGill, Nevada
 K11EV-D in Grants, etc., New Mexico
 K11EZ-D in Cashmere, Washington
 K11FF-D in Superior, Montana
 K11FJ-D in Squilchuck St. Park, Washington
 K11FQ-D in Thompson Falls, Montana
 K11GH-D in Tri Cities, etc., Oregon
 K11GT-D in Eugene, Oregon
 K11GX-D in Whitewater, Montana
 K11HM-D in Bonners Ferry, Idaho
 K11HO-D in Polson, Montana
 K11IA-D in Glasgow, Montana
 K11IH-D in Malta, Montana
 K11IL-D in Bitterroot Range, etc., Montana
 K11IV-D in Pioche, Nevada
 K11IY-D in Battle Mountain, Nevada
 K11JP-D in Plains-Paradise, Montana
 K11KE-D in Woods Bay, Montana
 K11KI-D in Dorena, etc., Oregon
 K11KO-D in Kamiah, Idaho
 K11KP-D in Troy, Montana
 K11LA-D in Basin, Montana
 K11LC-D in Prescott, Arizona, on virtual channel 3, which rebroadcasts KTVK
 K11LM-D in Thomasville, Colorado
 K11LP-D in Cortez, Colorado
 K11MP-D in White Sulphur Springs, Montana
 K11OO-D in Pine Valley, etc., Utah
 K11OW-D in Ursine, Nevada
 K11PB-D in Cambridge, Idaho
 K11PP-D in Dingle, etc., Idaho
 K11PS-D in Collbran, Colorado
 K11QE-D in Skagway, Alaska
 K11QG-D in Toksook Bay, Alaska
 K11QI-D in Ambler, Alaska
 K11QQ-D in Hildale, etc., Utah
 K11QY-D in Kwethluk, Alaska
 K11RN-D in Douglas, Wyoming
 K11RX-D in Big Arm, Montana
 K11SZ-D in Oakridge, Oregon
 K11TJ-D in Sargents, Colorado, on virtual channel 8, which rebroadcasts K06HN-D
 K11TY-D in Salmon, Idaho
 K11UN-D in Coolin, Idaho
 K11UU-D in Pago Pago, American Samoa
 K11UW-D in Akron, Colorado, on virtual channel 3, which rebroadcasts KCDO-TV
 K11VI-D in Elkton, Oregon
 K11VY-D in Toquerville, Utah, on virtual channel 2, which rebroadcasts KUTV
 K11WF-D in Mink Creek, Idaho, on virtual channel 4, which rebroadcasts KTVX
 K11WK-D in Stanford, Montana
 K11WM-D in Townsend, Montana
 K11WQ-D in West Knees, Montana
 K11WR-D in Council, Idaho
 K11WT-D in McCall, Idaho
 K11WY-D in Coulee City, Washington
 K11WZ-D in Delta Junction, etc., Alaska
 K11XC-D in Salina & Redmond, Utah
 K11XD-D in Rural Juab, etc., Utah
 K11XE-D in Marysvale, Utah
 K11XF-D in Woodland, Utah
 K11XG-D in Logan, Utah
 K11XI-D in Beaver etc., Utah
 K11XK-D in Helper, Utah
 K11XL-D in Roosevelt, etc., Utah, on virtual channel 9, which rebroadcasts KUEN
 K11XM-D in East Price, Utah, on virtual channel 9, which rebroadcasts KUEN
 K11XP-D in Boise, Idaho
 K11XU-D in El Centro, California
 K21KJ-D in Mineral Wells, Texas, on virtual channel 40
 K38AJ-D in Blanding/Monticello, Utah, on virtual channel 11, which rebroadcasts KBYU-TV
 K41LC-D in Long Valley Junction, Utah
 KCBA in Salinas, California
 KCBD in Lubbock, Texas
 KCBY-TV in Coos Bay, Oregon
 KDIN-TV in Des Moines, Iowa
 KDTP in Holbrook, Arizona, on virtual channel 11
 KEET in Eureka, California
 KELO-TV in Sioux Falls, South Dakota
 KFFX-TV in Pendleton, Oregon
 KFVS-TV in Cape Girardeau, Missouri
 KGIN in Grand Island, Nebraska
 KGMC in Merced, California
 KHAW-TV in Hilo, Hawaii
 KHET in Honolulu, Hawaii
 KHOU in Houston, Texas, on virtual channel 11
 KJST-LD in McAllen, Texas
 KJUD in Juneau, Alaska
 KKRM-LD in Chico, California
 KLST in San Angelo, Texas
 KLVX in Las Vegas, Nevada
 KMLU in Columbia, Louisiana
 KMVT in Twin Falls, Idaho
 KNSO in Merced, California
 KOAB-TV in Bend, Oregon
 KOED-TV in Tulsa, Oklahoma
 KPJC-LD in San Francisco, California, on virtual channel 24, which rebroadcasts KAAP-LD
 KQCK in Cheyenne, Wyoming, on virtual channel 33
 KQSD-TV in Lowry, South Dakota
 KRII in Chisholm, Minnesota
 KSBK-LD in Colorado Springs, Colorado
 KSNG in Garden City, Kansas
 KSTW in Tacoma, Washington, on virtual channel 11
 KSWO-TV in Lawton, Oklahoma
 KTTV in Los Angeles, California, on virtual channel 11
 KTVF in Fairbanks, Alaska
 KTVN in Reno, Nevada
 KTWU in Topeka, Kansas
 KUFM-TV in Missoula, Montana
 KULR-TV in Billings, Montana
 KUVN-CD in Fort Worth, Texas, on virtual channel 23, which rebroadcasts KUVN-DT
 KVCT in Victoria, Texas
 KVHC-LD in Kerrville, Texas
 KWSE in Williston, North Dakota
 KWVT-LD in Salem, Oregon, on virtual channel 17, which rebroadcasts KLSM-LD
 W11AJ-D in Franklin, North Carolina
 W11AN-D in Bryson City, North Carolina
 W11DH-D in Wabasso, Florida
 W11DM-D in Collegedale, Tennessee
 W11DR-D in Wilmington, North Carolina
 WBKB-TV in Alpena, Michigan
 WBRE-TV in Wilkes-Barre, Pennsylvania
 WCIX in Springfield, Illinois
 WDFL-LD in Miami, Florida, on virtual channel 18
 WDNZ-LD in Glasgow, Kentucky
 WENH-TV in Durham, New Hampshire, on virtual channel 11
 WESH in Daytona Beach, Florida, an ATSC 3.0 station, on virtual channel 2
 WGVU-TV in Grand Rapids, Michigan
 WHAS-TV in Louisville, Kentucky
 WISC-TV in Madison, Wisconsin
 WJDP-LD in Pigeon Forge, Tennessee
 WJKF-CD in Jacksonville, Florida
 WJZ-TV in Baltimore, Maryland, on virtual channel 13
 WLFI-TV in Lafayette, Indiana, on virtual channel 18
 WLII-DT in Caguas, Puerto Rico, on virtual channel 11
 WNIB-LD in Rochester, New York
 WPCW in Jeannette, Pennsylvania, on virtual channel 19
 WPIX in New York, New York, on virtual channel 11
 WPNY-LD in Utica, etc., New York
 WSPA-TV in Spartanburg, South Carolina, on virtual channel 7
 WTNC-LD in Durham, North Carolina, on virtual channel 26, which rebroadcasts WUVC-DT
 WTOC-TV in Savannah, Georgia
 WTOL in Toledo, Ohio
 WTVA in Tupelo, Mississippi
 WTVM in Columbus, Georgia
 WTZT-CD in Athens, Alabama
 WUEO-LD in Macon, Georgia, on virtual channel 49
 WVTT-CD in Olean, New York
 WWLP in Springfield, Massachusetts
 WYCH-LD in Rockford, Illinois
 WYCW in Asheville, North Carolina, uses WSPA-TV's spectrum, on virtual channel 62
 WYES-TV in New Orleans, Louisiana

The following station, which is no longer licensed, formerly broadcast on digital channel 11 in the United States:
 K11BI-D in Entiat, Washington
 K11MU-D in Paradise Valley, Nevada
 K11QN-D in Aniak, Alaska
 K11RQ-D in Chignik Lake, Alaska
 K11VP-D in Homer-Seldovia, Alaska
 K11XT-D in Mariposa, California
 KSWT in Yuma, Arizona
 W11AY-D in St John Plantation, Maine
 WETV-CD in Murfreesboro, Tennessee
 WMTO-LD in Manteo, North Carolina

References

11 digital